John Gildersleeve (born July 1944) is a British businessman, the chairman of British Land.

Early life
John Gildersleeve was born in July 1944. His father was a sergeant in the Army and his mother was "ambitiously intelligent". He grew up in a rented house in south London, and was the only boy in his year to go to grammar school.

Career
Gildersleeve left school at 18, and joined Shell as a clerk. At 19, he joined Tesco as a trainee manager, having been interviewed by Ian MacLaurin, then an area manager, now Lord MacLaurin. He rose to join the board in 1984, and was a director for 20 years.

He has been the chairman of British Land since January 2013. He is deputy chairman of TalkTalk. He was formerly chairman of New Look, EMI Group, Gallaher Group and Carphone Warehouse; deputy chairman of Spire Healthcare; and a non-executive director of Lloyds TSB, Vodafone Group, Dixons Carphone and Tesco.

Personal life
Gildersleeve lives in the UK. He has daughters.

References

1944 births
Living people
British chairpersons of corporations
Lloyds Banking Group people
Tesco people
British Land people